Utvängstorp Church is a  medieval church  at Mullsjö Municipality in Jönköping County, Sweden. It belongs to the Mullsjö-Sandhem Parish (Mullsjö-Sandhems församling) of the Church of Sweden. The church is located about 20 kilometers north of Mullsjö, the central city of Mullsjö municipality.

History
The church dates back to the later 12th century. It is built of stone with whitewashed facades.
Just south of the church stands a bell tower from 1735.  In 1838, the church underwent a thorough rebuilding and extension with a new choir area to the east and new sacristy east of the choir. In 1960 the interior was restored.  In 1989 a major renovation was conducted.

References

External links
Utvängstorps kyrka website
Map of Utvängstorps Kyrka

12th-century churches in Sweden
Churches in Mullsjö Municipality
Churches in the Diocese of Skara
Churches converted from the Roman Catholic Church to the Church of Sweden